Cistus crispus is a shrubby species of flowering plant in the family Cistaceae , with pink to purple flowers, native to south-western Europe and western north Africa.

Description
They have three prominent veins and are covered a mixture of short stellate hairs and longer simple hairs.

Taxonomy
Cistus crispus was first described by Carl Linnaeus in 1753 in Species Plantarum (p. 524). The specific epithet crispus means "curly" or "finely waved", referring to the leaves.

It hybridizes with Cistus albidus to form the hybrid Cistus × incanus.

Phylogeny
A 2011 molecular phylogenetic study placed C. crispus as the deepest branching member of the clade of purple and pink flowered Cistus species (the "purple pink clade" or PPC).

Distribution
Cistus crispus is native to north Africa and south-western Europe, including Portugal, Spain, France, Corsica, Italy and Sicily.

References

External links
 

crispus
Plants described in 1753
Taxa named by Carl Linnaeus